Volker Perthes, born 16 May 1958 in Duisburg-Homberg, Germany) is a German political scientist, academic and writer. Apart from his focus on research, writing and teaching about the Middle East, he was director of the German Institute for International and Security Affairs (SWP). Since 2021, he has been Special Representative of the Secretary-General of the United Nations (SRSG) for Sudan and Head of the UN Integrated Transition Assistance Mission in Sudan (UNITAMS).

Early life and education 
Perthes studied for his first degrees in political science at the University of Duisburg and in Arabic language at the University of Bochum in Germany. From 1986 to 1987, he received a graduate scholarship from the German Academic Exchange Service to do research for his PhD in Syria. In 1990, Perthes received his PhD in political science with a thesis on the state and society in Syria from 1970 to 1989.

Career
From 1991 to 1993, Perthes was assistant professor at the American University of Beirut and then taught at the German universities of Duisburg, Münster and Munich. In 1999, he earned his postdoctoral degree (habilitation) at the University of Duisburg. 

In 1992, Perthes started to work at the German Institute for International and Security Affairs (German acronym: SWP). The main task of the SWP is to advise the German parliament and the Federal Government of Germany on questions of foreign and security policy, based on the institute's practice-oriented research. Until April 2005, Perthes was Head for the research group on the Middle East and Africa, and in October 2005, he became Director and Chief Executive Officer of the institute. After he left for positions with the United Nations, he continues with SWP as non-resident Senior Fellow. At the same time, he also taught as adjunct professor at the Humboldt University and at the Free University of Berlin. Based on his research, Perthes has published several non-fiction books as well as academic and policy papers on Syria, Lebanon, Iran, the European Union and the Palestinian Authority, including the wider Middle East. Apart from his native German, he is fluent in English and Arabic.

In September 2015, Perthes joined the Special Envoy of the Secretary-General for Syria, Staffan de Mistura, as Assistant Secretary-General and Senior Advisor to the UN in their talks for a peace process in Syria, and in October 2016, he became Chairperson of the International Syria Support Group’s Ceasefire Taskforce for Syria. 

In November 2015, Federal Minister for Economic Affairs and Energy Sigmar Gabriel appointed Perthes to the government's advisory board on the Transatlantic Trade and Investment Partnership (TTIP).

Special Representative for Sudan and Head of UNITAMS 
On January 8, 2021, Perthes was appointed by the UN Secretary-General as Special Representative (SRSG) for Sudan and Head of the new UN Integrated Transition Assistance Mission in Sudan (UNITAMS). Following the October 2021 Sudanese coup d'état, Perthes held mediation talks with generals Abdel Fattah al Burhan and Mohamed Hamdan Dagalo, as well as with Prime Minister Abdalla Hamdouk, who was under house arrest, in order to "return to a comprehensive and urgent dialogue to restore partnership on the basis of the Constitutional Document and the Juba Peace Agreement."

On December 11, 2021, Perthes briefed the UN-Security Council on the situation in Sudan after Hamdok had been reinstated on 21 November 2021 as Prime Minister, following the October 2021 Sudanese coup d'état. In his report and analysis, he made the following remarks:

Professional memberships
Prior to his nomination as SRSG in Sudan, Perthes was a member of several scientific advisory bodies, such as the Shanghai Institute for International Studies (SIIS), as chairperson for the advisory council of the Finnish Institute of International Affairs (FIIA), and the German Robert Bosch Foundation's International Advisory Council.

Distinctions
 2009: Karl Carstens Award of the German Federal Academy for Security Policy
 2011: Order of Merit of the Federal Republic of Germany

Select publications

as author 

 Economic Change, Political Control and Decision Making in Syria, Reportnummer SWP S 401, Stiftung Wissenschaft und Politik, Forschungsinstitut für Internationale Politik und Sicherheit, Ebenhausen 1994.
The Political Economy of Syria under Asad, London: I.B. Tauris 1995.
Nizam al-sira` fi al-sharq al-awsat: al-makhatir al-mulazima li-`amaliat al-taswiya [The Conflict System in the Middle East: The Risks Accompanying the Settlement Process], Beirut: Centre for Strategic Studies, Research and Documentation 1997.
 with Muriel Asseburg: The European Union and the Palestinian Authority. Recommendations for a New Policy. Reportnummer SWP S 421, Stiftung Wissenschaft und Politik, Forschungsinstitut für Internationale Politik und Sicherheit, Ebenhausen 1998.
 Syria under Bashar al-Assad: Modernisation and the Limits of Change, London: Institute for Strategic Studies/ Oxford University Press 2004 (Adelphi Paper 366).

as editor 

 Scenarios for Syria. Socio-economic and Political Choices (= Aktuelle Materialien zur internationalen Politik, Band 45), Nomos, Baden-Baden 1998 (ISBN 3-7890-5722-3).
 Germany and the Middle East. Interests and Options, Heinrich Böll Foundation, Berlin 2003 (ISBN 3-927760-42-0).
Arab Elites: Negotiating the Politics of Change, Boulder: Lynne Rienner 2004

other publications 

 
 
 
Scientific policy advice and foreign policymaking – Stiftung Wissenschaft und Politik (SWP), the German Institute for International and Security Affairs, in: Lentsch, Justus / Weingart, Peter (eds.), The Politics of Scientific Advice. Institutional Design for Quality Assurance, Cambridge: Cambridge University Press 2011, p. 286-294.

External links 

 
 Short CV and publications in English by Volker Perthes

References 

1958 births
Living people

German political scientists

20th-century German writers
21st-century German writers
Special Representatives of the Secretary-General of the United Nations
People involved in the Syrian peace process
German officials of the United Nations
United Nations operations in Sudan
Recipients of the Cross of the Order of Merit of the Federal Republic of Germany